In Greek mythology, the name Toxeus or Toxius (Ancient Greek: Τοξεύς means "bowman") refers to the following individuals:

Toxius, son of Caelus (Uranus) who was the inventor of building with clay, it having been suggested to him from swallows' nests.
Toxeus, a Pleuronian prince as the son of King Thestius and thus, brother of Althaea. He participated in the hunt for the Calydonian Boar but was angry that the prize of the boar's hide had been given to a woman (Atalanta) by his nephew Meleager, who then killed him in the ensuing argument.
Toxeus, a Calydonian prince as the son of King Oeneus and Althaea (which makes him a nephew of the above Toxeus). He was the brother of Meleager, Clymenus, Periphas, Agelaus (or Ageleus), Thyreus (or Phereus or Pheres), Deianeira, Gorge, Eurymede and Melanippe. Toxeus was killed by his father for over leaping the trench which had been dug around Calydon. (This is paralleled by Remus overleaping that of Rōmulus. Cf. also the story of Poemander).
Toxeus, an Oechalian prince as son of King Eurytus and Antiope or Antioche and brother of Clytius and Molion. All three were slain by Heracles. His other siblings were Iole, Deioneus, Didaeon and Iphitos.

Notes

References 

 Antoninus Liberalis, The Metamorphoses of Antoninus Liberalis translated by Francis Celoria (Routledge 1992). Online version at the Topos Text Project.
 Apollodorus, The Library with an English Translation by Sir James George Frazer, F.B.A., F.R.S. in 2 Volumes, Cambridge, MA, Harvard University Press; London, William Heinemann Ltd. 1921. . Online version at the Perseus Digital Library. Greek text available from the same website.
Apollonius Rhodius, Argonautica translated by Robert Cooper Seaton (1853-1915), R. C. Loeb Classical Library Volume 001. London, William Heinemann Ltd, 1912. Online version at the Topos Text Project.
 Apollonius Rhodius, Argonautica. George W. Mooney. London. Longmans, Green. 1912. Greek text available at the Perseus Digital Library.
 Diodorus Siculus, The Library of History translated by Charles Henry Oldfather. Twelve volumes. Loeb Classical Library. Cambridge, Massachusetts: Harvard University Press; London: William Heinemann, Ltd. 1989. Vol. 3. Books 4.59–8. Online version at Bill Thayer's Web Site
 Diodorus Siculus, Bibliotheca Historica. Vol 1-2. Immanel Bekker. Ludwig Dindorf. Friedrich Vogel. in aedibus B. G. Teubneri. Leipzig. 1888–1890. Greek text available at the Perseus Digital Library.
 Hesiod, Catalogue of Women from Homeric Hymns, Epic Cycle, Homerica translated by Evelyn-White, H G. Loeb Classical Library Volume 57. London: William Heinemann, 1914. Online version at theio.com
Pliny the Elder, The Natural History. John Bostock, M.D., F.R.S. H.T. Riley, Esq., B.A. London. Taylor and Francis, Red Lion Court, Fleet Street. 1855. Online version at the Perseus Digital Library.
Pliny the Elder, Naturalis Historia. Karl Friedrich Theodor Mayhoff. Lipsiae. Teubner. 1906. Latin text available at the Perseus Digital Library.
 Publius Ovidius Naso, Metamorphoses translated by Brookes More (1859-1942). Boston, Cornhill Publishing Co. 1922. Online version at the Perseus Digital Library.
 Publius Ovidius Naso, Metamorphoses. Hugo Magnus. Gotha (Germany). Friedr. Andr. Perthes. 1892. Latin text available at the Perseus Digital Library.

Demigods in classical mythology
Princes in Greek mythology
Aetolian characters in Greek mythology
Mythology of Heracles
de:Toxeus
sk:Toxeus